Rabindranath Murmu is an Indian Santali language writer from Jharkhand. He won Sahitya Akademi Award for Santali Translation in 2012.

Biography
Murmu is Tala Tudu's brother. He worked in Tata Steel.

Murmu translated Mahasweta Devi's novel Iter Upor It into Santali titled Ita Chetan Re Ita. For this work he was awarded  Sahitya Akademi Translation Prize in 2012. He also translated Acharya Chatur Singh's Hindi book Sachhai Ki Karamaat  Sarat Chandra Chattopadhyay’s Bengali book Boro Didi.

References

Indian translators
Living people
1960s births
Recipients of the Sahitya Akademi Award for Translation into Santali
Santali people
Recipients of the Sahitya Akademi Prize for Translation